Elections to Edinburgh Corporation were held on 2 May 1961, alongside municipal elections across Scotland. Of the councils 69 seats, 23 were up for election. However, only 16 seats were contested, as councillors were returned unopposed in seven wards.

Only one seat changed hands; Corstorphine ward was gained by the Liberal party from the Progressive Party.

After the election Edinburgh Corporation was composed of 38 Progressives, 28 Labour councillors, 2 Liberal, and 1 Protestant Action. The Progressives retained overall control of the council.

Turnout in the 14 contested wards was 76,953 or 33.7%.

Aggregate results

Ward Results

References

1961
1961 Scottish local elections